Lymnaea tomentosa is a species of freshwater snail, an aquatic gastropod mollusc in the family Lymnaeidae.

This species lives in New Zealand. These snails are found in both the North and South Islands and on aquatic plants in swamps, ponds, and quiet waters. In Australia (in particular South-East New South Wales), this species was reported to serve as one of the most important intermediate hosts for liver fluke (Fasciola hepatica).

Subspecies
 Lymnaea tomentosa hamiltoni (Dell, 1956)
 Austropeplea tomentosa tomentosa (L. Pfeiffer, 1855)

Parasites 
Lymnaea tomentosa is an intermediate host of Fasciola hepatica. Lymnaea tomentosa was also shown to be receptive to miracidia of Fasciola gigantica from East Africa, Malaysia and Indonesia under laboratory conditions.

References

External links

Lymnaeidae
Gastropods described in 1855